Emmanuel Imanishimwe (born 2 February 1995) is a Rwandan footballer who plays as a left-back for Moroccan club FAR Rabat and the Rwanda national football team.

Club career
In August 2021, he joined Moroccan club FAR Rabat on a three-year contract for a fee of 130 million Rwandan francs.

References

External links
 

1995 births
Living people
Rwandan footballers
People from Kigali
Association football fullbacks
Rayon Sports F.C. players
APR F.C. players
Rwanda National Football League players
Rwanda international footballers
Rwanda A' international footballers
2020 African Nations Championship players